Rhenish Franconia or Western Franconia denotes the western half of the central German stem duchy of Franconia in the 10th and 11th century, with its residence at the city of Worms. The territory located on the banks of Rhine river roughly corresponded with the present-day state of Hesse and the adjacent Palatinate region in the south.

History

The Franconian stem duchy, part of former Frankish Austrasia, was seized by King Otto I of Germany after the unsuccessful revolt of the Conradine duke Eberhard had shattered at the 939 Battle of Andernach. With the advancement of Count Conrad the Red, Rhenish Franconia became the heartland of the Imperial Salian dynasty, which provided four emperors in the 11th and 12th centuries: Conrad II, Henry III, Henry IV, and Henry V. It contained the ancient cities of Mainz, Speyer and Worms, the latter two being the administrative centres of countships within the hands of the Salian descendants of Conrad the Red. These counts were sometimes referred to informally, on account of the great power in the region, as dukes of Franconia. 

Emperor Conrad II was actually the last to bear the ducal title. When he died in 1039, Rhenish Franconia was governed as a constellation of small states, like the cities of Frankfurt, Speyer and Worms, the Prince-bishoprics of Mainz, Speyer, and Worms, as well as the Landgraviate of Hesse, then part of Thuringia. Alongside these powerful entities there were many smaller, petty states. In 1093, Emperor Henry IV gave the Salian territories in Rhenish Franconia as a fief to Henry of Laach, the Count palatine of Lower Lorraine at Aachen, his lands then would evolve into the important principality of the Electoral Palatinate. While Emperor Frederick Barbarossa in 1198 granted the ducal title to the Prince-Bishops of Würzburg in Eastern Franconia, Rhenish Franconia was divided and extinguished. Its territories became part of the Imperial Upper Rhenish Circle in 1500.

Successor states of Western Franconia
The following are the most important states that had formed on the territory of Western (or Rhenish) Franconia by the 13th century:

Modern Franconia

The eastern half of the historic duchy of Franconia on the Main river around the city of Würzburg and Nuremberg forms the modern Franconian region of northern Bavaria; the Würzburg bishops retained the title of "Duke of Franconia".

Literature
  Meyers Konversationslexikon. S. 902f. Leipzig 1897 (Karte von Ostfranken und Westfranken in "Deutschland um 1000")
  

Former states and territories of Hesse
Medieval Germany